Tilda or TILDA may refer to:
Tilda, a variant of the female given name Matilda
Tilda (cocktail)
Tilda (food manufacturer), British food brand specializing in rice
Tilda (software), GTK terminal emulator
Tilda Johnson, the secret identity of Nightshade
Tilda Newra, municipality near Raipur City, India
Tilda Swinton (born 1960), British actress
Tilda Thamar (1921–1989), Argentine actress
The Irish Longitudinal Study on Ageing (TILDA)

See also